Pasiphilodes subtrita is a moth in the family Geometridae. It is found on the Marshall Islands, Woodlark Island, Tahiti, in Tonga and on Fiji, Rotuma, Samoa, Borneo, the Andamans, the Cocos-Keeling Islands, the Seychelles and Aldabra.

References

Moths described in 1866
Eupitheciini
Fauna of Seychelles